Palaephatus striatus is a moth of the  family Palaephatidae. It is found in the wetter Valdivian forests of central Argentina and Chile from Lago Puyehue and Lago Nahuel Huapi south to Chiloe Island.

The length of the forewings is 9-11.2 mm for males and 10–11 mm for females. Adults have buff-colored forewings streaked with darker brown spots and lines. They are on wing from September to February, possibly in one generation per year.

Etymology
The specific name is derived from Latin striatus (meaning channel, groove or furrow).

References

Moths described in 1986
Palaephatidae
Taxa named by Donald R. Davis (entomologist)